Route 935 is a -long north-to-south secondary highway in the southeastern portion of New Brunswick, Canada.

Route description
Most of the route is in Westmorland County.

The route's northern terminus is in Dorchester at Route 106. It travels southeast through a mostly marsh area where it begins following the Memramcook River.  The route passes through Dorchester Cape, then following the Bay of Fundy to Johnson's Mills then turns south east to Upper Rockport.  From here, the road turns northeast passing through Wood Point, then passing by British Settlement then Westcock.  The route then turns east ending in West Sackville at Route 106 near East Branch Tantramar River.

Major intersections

See also

References

935
935